LFX may refer to:

3.6 L variant of GM High Feature V6 engine
A variant of the Nova Bus LF Series designed for bus rapid transit applications
The Lexus LF-X
Live fire exercise
Labuan Financial Exchange
Low profile form factor, a form factor of power supply unit (computer)